Palaeosia is a monotypic moth genus in the family Erebidae erected by George Hampson in 1900. Its only species, Palaeosia bicosta, the two-ribbed arctiid or two-ribbed footman, was first described by Francis Walker in 1854. It is found in south-eastern Australia.

The wingspan is about 30 mm.

The larvae feed on lichen.

Former species
 Palaeosia longistriga, now Oeonosia longistriga (Bethune-Baker, 1908)

References

Lithosiina
Moths described in 1854
Monotypic moth genera